XHPSP-FM is a radio station on 106.3 FM in Piedras Negras, Coahuila, Mexico. It is owned by Radiorama and carries a grupera format known as Fiesta Mexicana.

History
XHPSP received its concession on October 4, 1994. It has been owned by Radiorama for its entire existence.

References

Radio stations in Coahuila
Radio stations established in 1994
1994 establishments in Mexico